The Megawatt Charging System (MCS) is a charging connector under development for large battery electric vehicles.

The MCS connector is being advanced by the CharIN organization, with aspirations that it become a worldwide standard charging connector for large and medium commercial vehicles be it on land, water or in the air, but other large vehicle charging interfaces are also progressing and being brought into serial production.

History
A Charging Interface Initiative e.V. (CharIN) task force was formed by industry actors in March 2018, with the purpose to "define a new commercial vehicle high power charging standard to maximize customer flexibility." CharIN had previously developed the Combined Charging System (CCS) specification. From early 2018 until late 2019, the abbreviation HPCCV (High Power Charging for Commercial Vehicles) was used, following the name of the CharIN consortium taskforce. The purpose statement was later revised to "work out requirements for a new commercial vehicle high power charging solution to maximize customer flexibility when using fully electric commercial vehicles. The scope of the technical recommendation is to be limited to the connector, and any related requirements for the EVSE, the vehicle, communication, and related hardware."

The HPCCV held a meeting in September 2018 to build consensus on proposed requirements, and the CharIN Board of Management approved a set of consensus requirements in November 2018. Five companies submitted candidate designs to meet the requirements: Tesla, Electrify America, ABB, paXos, and Stäubli. HPCCV selected a charging plug and socket design in May 2019, which was endorsed by CharIN leadership in September 2019. The version 1.0 HPCCV connector had a triangular shape and round power pins, but the design required further development as it was not finger-proof.

A test of seven vehicle inlets and eleven connectors was held at the US National Renewable Energy Laboratory (NREL) in September 2020. The prototype hardware represented designs from seven different manufacturers, and six additional manufacturers participated virtually. Criteria evaluated included fit/compatibility, ergonomics, and thermal performance. Evaluations at maximum current (3000 A) were conducted with cooling of both the inlet and the connector; for connector cooling only, current was limited to 1000 A, and without cooling, current was limited to 350 A. Versions 2.0 through 2.4 of the MCS connector used "hairpin" shaped contacts, but it was later changed to version 3.0 through 3.2, which returned to the triangular shape with larger pins and longer protective sheaths to prevent accidental contact. 

The task force had anticipated that a requirements and specification document would be published by the end of 2021. MCS connector version 3.2 was adopted in December 2021. CharIN intends to complete the specification document by 2024, which is planned to be in a state that is ready to be adopted by ISO and IEC as a global standard. In preparation, SAE International began developing the draft MCS standards into the J3271 requirements in December 2021; in parallel, the IEC began developing standard 63379 in Spring 2021.

The final standard shall be resolved in 2024. There is an open point in testing 	interference immunity of the  PLC connection, otherwise the communication would need to switch to a CAN connection on the same pilot pins. Additionally the protocol on the PLC connection should support TCP/IP, so that ISO 15118 services have a direct connection to the vehicle electronics (Verhicle-To-Grid, Plug-N-Charge).

Specific implementations
Lilium GmbH announced in October 2021 that forthcoming VTOL Lilium Jets with their 900 kWh battery would be fitted with MCS for charging. Charging stations with MCS connectors will be delivered by ABB in 2024. ABB charging stations have been operated at interoperability testing events.

Three truck charging stations will be built and operated in the Swedish project E-Charge. The chargers will be installed on three different locations in southern Sweden and will be utilized by four authentic logistics flows during a year's time starting in Q1 2024. The electric trucks will be provided by Scania and Volvo while the chargers will be provided by ABB.

The German national project „“, commonly referred to as the HoLa project (from German , literally high capacity charging park for the charging sites), will build four new truck charging stations along the Autobahn A2 from Berlin to Duisburg. Each station will be equipped initially with two 600 kW stations starting in June 2022, and will be upgraded to 1 Megawatt using MCS in fall 2023. The chargers will be built by Heliox.

The German Association of the Automotive Industry (VDA) published the  "Masterplan Ladeinfrastruktur 2.0" in February 2022 in which they proposed to extend the Deutschlandnetz state-funded charging network into a "" (national fast-charging network for trucks). Whereas the current plan requires 200 kW per charging point using CCS, the next phase will require 700 kW per charging point using MCS.

In January 2023 an early Tesla Semi was spotted with version 2 of the MSC charging port.

Design requirements
Key requirements include:
 Single conductive plug
 Maximum of 1250 V DC and 3000 A
 Differential PLC + ISO/IEC 15118 - 20 (ISO 15118-20 Communication Protocols allows bi-directional energy flow for vehicle-to-grid (V2G), Smart Charging, Encrypted Communication, Plug ‘n Charge, Automated Charging)
 Touch Safe (UL2251)
 On-handle software-interpreted override switch
 Adherence to OSHA / ADA (or local equivalent) standards (dictates sizes using anthropometric data and masses using ergonomic data)
 FCC Class A EMI (or local equivalent)
 Located on driver's side of the vehicle, hip height (ergonomics)
 Capable of being automated
 UL / NRTL certified
 Cyber-Secure
 V2X (bi-directional) based on ISO15118-20

MCS is intended for Class 6, 7, and 8 commercial vehicles, initially with a primarily focus on large trucks and busses, but potential MCS applications to the Aeronautics industry (e-VTOL, e-Planes, etc…) and Marine Industry (Tug-boats, e-Ferries, River Cargo vessels, etc…) exist. For road vehicles, the vehicle inlet should be placed on the driver's side of the vehicle (left side in North America), between the front and rear axles.

A CCS Combo 1/Combo 2/SAE J3068 or ChaoJi inlet may also be fitted to the vehicle for compatibility and AC charging. Black & Veatch have designed prototype layout requirements for vehicle charging lanes.

See also 

 Tesla Megacharger
 Ultra-ChaoJi

References

External links
 
 
https://www.charin.global/

DC power connectors
Automotive standards
Automotive technologies
Charging stations
Electric vehicle technologies
Electrical connectors
Trucks
2021 introductions